Jilkminggan is a small community in the Northern Territory of Australia.

The community has had books published about local stories.

Notes

External links
 Jilkminggan (Roper Gulf Regional Council)

Aboriginal communities in the Northern Territory